Gino Redi (26 November 1908 – 27 September 1962) was an Italian composer. He was sometimes credited as P.G. Redi.

Biography 
Born Luigi Pulci in Rome, after graduating in composition at the conservatory of Parma, Redi moved to Milan where he was active as a conductor for several small orchestras. In 1934 he started composing, debuting with the song "È finito il bel tempo che fu".

Starting from the second half of the 1930s Redi was one of the most successful songwriters of his time. Among his best known songs are "Perché non sognar", "Aggio perduto 'o suonno" and "Non Dimenticar". He participated to four editions of the Sanremo Music Festival between 1951 and 1961.

References

External links 
 
 

1908 births
1962 deaths
20th-century Italian composers
Italian film score composers
Italian male film score composers
Musicians from Rome
Italian male conductors (music)
Italian songwriters
Male songwriters
20th-century Italian conductors (music)
20th-century Italian male musicians